Events from the year 1949 in Michigan.

Top stories
The Associated Press polled editors of its member newspapers in Michigan and ranked the state's top news stories of 1949 as follows:
 The March 1 "lonely hearts" murders of a widow and her three-year-old granddaughter in Grand Rapids. The killers were Raymond Fernandez and Martha Beck. (274 points)
 The shooting UAW leader Victor G. Reuther (224 points)
 A historic contract between the UAW and Ford Motor granting pensions to workers (175 points)
 The speed-up strike against Ford that began in May and lasted 26 days (169 points)
 The July 19 death of U.S. Supreme Court Justice and former Michigan Governor Frank Murphy (129 points)
 Record production by the automobile industry and shutdowns resulting from the steelworkers strike (115)
 The March 31 death of Willard Dow, president of Dow Chemical, and his wife and three others in a plane crash (98)
 Farmer in Waterford shoots 10 people with a shotgun (88)
 The "social reform" program of Governor G. Mennen Williams and political battles to institute it (87)
 The end of Michigan's one-man grand juries (86)

Office holders

State office holders

 Governor of Michigan: G. Mennen Williams (Democrat)
 Lieutenant Governor of Michigan: John W. Connolly (Democrat)
 Michigan Attorney General: Stephen John Roth
 Michigan Secretary of State: Frederick M. Alger Jr. (Republican)
 Speaker of the Michigan House of Representatives: Victor A. Knox (Republican)
 Chief Justice, Michigan Supreme Court:

Mayors of major cities
 Mayor of Detroit: Eugene Van Antwerp (Democrat)
 Mayor of Grand Rapids: George W. Welsh (Republican)/Stanley J. Davis (Democrat)
 Mayor of Flint: George G. Wills
 Mayor of Saginaw: Harold J. Stenglein/Edwin W. Koepke
 Mayor of Lansing: Ralph Crego

Federal office holders
 U.S. Senator from Michigan: Homer S. Ferguson (Republican)
 U.S. Senator from Michigan: Arthur Vandenberg (Republican) 
 House District 1: George G. Sadowski (Democrat)
 House District 2: Earl C. Michener (Republican)
 House District 3: Paul W. Shafer (Republican)
 House District 4: Clare Hoffman (Republican)
 House District 5: Gerald Ford (Republican)
 House District 6: William W. Blackney (Republican)
 House District 7: Jesse P. Wolcott (Republican)
 House District 8: Fred L. Crawford (Republican)
 House District 9: Albert J. Engel (Republican)
 House District 10: Roy O. Woodruff (Republican)
 House District 11: Charles E. Potter (Republican)
 House District 12: John B. Bennett (Republican)
 House District 13: George D. O'Brien (Democrat)
 House District 14: Louis C. Rabaut (Democrat)
 House District 15: John D. Dingell Sr. (Democrat)
 House District 16: John Lesinski Sr. (Democrat)
 House District 17: George Anthony Dondero (Republican)

Population

Companies
The following is a list of major companies based in Michigan in 1949.

Sports

Baseball
 1949 Detroit Tigers season – 
 1949 Michigan Wolverines baseball season - Under head coach Ray Fisher, the Wolverines compiled an 18–9–2 record and tied for the Big Ten Conference championship. Harold Raymond was the team captain.

American football
 1949 Detroit Lions season –  
 1949 Michigan Wolverines football team – 
 1949 Michigan State Spartans football team – 
 1949 Detroit Titans football team –

Basketball
 1948–49 Michigan Wolverines men's basketball team –

Ice hockey
 1948–49 Detroit Red Wings season –

Boat racing
 APBA Gold Cup – 
 Harmsworth Cup –
 Port Huron to Mackinac Boat Race –

Boxing

Golfing
 Motor City Open - 
 Michigan Open -

Other

Chronology of events

Births
 January 14 - Lawrence Kasdan, screenwriter (The Empire Strikes Back, Raiders of the Lost Ark, Return of the Jedi, The Big Chill), director and producer, in Detroit
 January 15 - Bobby Grich, Major League Baseball second baseman (1970–1986), in Muskegon, Michigan
 August 9 - Ted Simmons, Major League Baseball catcher (1968–1988) and 8× All-Star, in Highland Park, Michigan

Deaths
 April 11 - Chase Osborn, 27th Governor of Michigan (1911-1913), at age 89 in Poulan, Georgia
 June 16 - William Comstock, 33rd Governor of Michigan (1933-1935), at age 71 in Detroit
 July 19 - Frank Murphy, Associate Justice of the Supreme Court of the United States (1940-1949), 35th Governor of Michigan (1937-1939), at age 59 in Detroit

See also
 History of Michigan
 History of Detroit

References